The 1985 NAIA men's basketball tournament was held in March at Kemper Arena in Kansas City, Missouri. The 48th annual NAIA basketball tournament featured 32 teams playing in a single-elimination format.

Awards and honors
Leading scorers:
Leading rebounder:
Player of the Year: est. 1994.

Bracket

  * denotes overtime.

See also
1985 NCAA Division I men's basketball tournament
1985 NCAA Division II men's basketball tournament
1985 NCAA Division III men's basketball tournament
1985 NAIA women's basketball tournament

References

NAIA Men's Basketball Championship
Tournament
NAIA men's basketball tournament
NAIA men's basketball tournament
College basketball tournaments in Missouri
Basketball competitions in Kansas City, Missouri